Francisco Maria da Silva (March 15, 1910—April 14, 1977) was a Portuguese prelate of the Roman Catholic Church. He served as Archbishop-Primate of Braga from 1963 until his death.

Biography
Francisco da Silva was born in Murtosa, and was ordained to the priesthood on May 21, 1932. On December 20, 1956, he was appointed Auxiliary Bishop of Braga and Titular Bishop of Telmissus by Pope Pius XII. He received his episcopal consecration on March 31, 1957, from Archbishop Antonio Martins Júnior, with Archbishop Manuel Ferreira da Silva and Bishop José Dias serving as co-consecrators.

Silva attended the Second Vatican Council from 1962 to 1965, and was named Archbishop of Braga on December 12, 1963.

Warm summer
On August 10, 1975, the archbishop delivered a speech in which he gave a scathing condemnation of communism, as well as demanding that the Portuguese Communist Party relinquish its take over of the Catholic-owned Radio Renascença, saying, "We want respect for public morality and moral values ... for fundamental human rights. Christian people must assume their responsibilities, certain that the best values guide their lives: God, his church, and the homeland". After the speech, thousands of his audience desecrated a flag torn down from Communist Party headquarters, and were fired upon. 

Francisco died at the age of 67, having served as archbishop for twenty-one years.

References

External links
Catholic-Hierarchy

1910 births
1977 deaths
People from Aveiro District
20th-century Roman Catholic archbishops in Portugal
Roman Catholic archbishops of Braga
Participants in the Second Vatican Council